Sorell School is a government co-educational  comprehensive primary and secondary school located in , a suburb of Hobart, Tasmania, Australia. Established in 1821, the school caters for approximately 900 students from Years K to 12. The school is administered by the Tasmanian Department of Education.

In 2019 student enrolments were 855. The school principal is Jenny Cowling.

In March 2017, the school was one of eighteen high schools that were expanded to cover Years 11 and 12.

Sorell School is the oldest continually operating public school in Australia.

See also 
 List of schools in Tasmania
 Education in Tasmania

References

External links 
 Sorell High School website

Public high schools in Hobart
Educational institutions established in 1821
Public primary schools in Hobart
1821 establishments in Australia